Mariana Mesa Pineda (born 1 April 1980) is a Colombian former professional tennis player.

Biography

Tennis career
Mesa, who grew up in the city of Pereira, made her Fed Cup debut in 1995, having just turned 15. She featured in a total of 12 ties for Colombia during her career, mostly as doubles player, winning seven matches overall.

On the WTA Tour, she made most of her main-draw appearances at her home event, the Copa Colsanitas, playing in every edition of the tournament from 1998 to 2000. She had her best performance in 1998, when she made the round of 16 of the singles and was a doubles semifinalist. Her only other singles main draw came at the 1999 Brasil Open, which she made as a qualifier.

Mesa reached a best singles ranking on tour of 251 in the world and won five ITF Women's Circuit tournaments. As a doubles player she had a top ranking of 161, with seven ITF titles.

At the 2000 Summer Olympics in Sydney, Mesa represented Colombia in the doubles competition, with Fabiola Zuluaga as her partner.

Life after tennis
Mesa now coaches tennis and also works as broadcaster with Win Sports. She studied political science at Universidad Javeriana.

ITF Circuit finals

Singles: 7 (5–2)

Doubles: 14 (7–7)

References

External links
 
 
 

1980 births
Living people
Colombian female tennis players
Olympic tennis players of Colombia
Tennis players at the 2000 Summer Olympics
Colombian television presenters
People from Pereira, Colombia
Pontifical Xavierian University alumni
Colombian women television presenters
21st-century Colombian women